The Hydroscaphidae are a small family of water beetles known commonly as skiff beetles. As of 2010, there are 23 species in the family. Several are recently described.

These beetles are small, most under  in length. They are tan to brown in color and the elytra are abbreviated, leaving several tapering tergites of the abdomen exposed. The wings are fringed with long setae. The larvae are fusiform, with a wide thorax and a narrowing abdomen.

Hydroscaphidae live on mats of algae with a thin layer of running water. This may be the accumulated algae lining the very edge of a stream of water. They tolerate a wide range of temperatures; they have been observed in hot springs and in icy snowmelt. The algae are their food source.

The reproductive cycle is not well known. In at least one species, the female lays a single large egg on the algal mat.

Hydroscaphid species have been reported from every continent except Antarctica.

Genera:

 Hydroscapha LeConte, 1874
 Scaphydra Reichardt, 1973
 Yara Reichardt & Hinton, 1976

Confossa Short, Joly, García & Maddison, 2015

References

Further reading

External links 

 Hydroscaphidae. Tree of Life.

Myxophaga
Beetle families